Jean Smart is an American actress.

Filmography

Film

Sources: Internet Movie Database and Turner Classic Movies

Television

Sources: Internet Movie Database and TV Guide

Theatre

References 

Actress filmographies